Karl Hermann Christian Jordan (23 March 1888 – 6 March 1972) was a German entomologist and gymnast who competed in the 1912 Summer Olympics. He was born in Papstdorf (then known as Pfaffdorf), Saxony. In 1912 he was a member of the German team which finished fourth in the team, free system competition and fifth in the team, European system event. Jordan was also a professor of zoology, with six species of heteroptera named after him.

Jordan was born to a farming family in Papstdorf, a farming village in Sächsische Schweiz-Osterzgebirge, Germany. He studied science in Jena and Leipzig. In 1948/1949 he took up a position in Dresden, first as professor of zoology, and then director of the zoological institute at the Royal Saxon Academy of Forestry in Tharandt. He led the 
for 22 years, and was editor of its publication, Isis Budissina. He is particularly known for his work on the Heteroptera, but published widely on the insects of Saxony and Upper Lusatia. His own collection was later taken into the Natural History Museum, Berlin.

References

1888 births
1972 deaths
German male artistic gymnasts
Olympic gymnasts of Germany
Gymnasts at the 1912 Summer Olympics
Sportspeople from Saxony